Nordfjorden is the sixth longest fjord in Norway.  It flows through the municipalities of Stryn, Gloppen, Stad, Bremanger, and Kinn, and it is the central feature of the entire Nordfjord region which makes up the northern third of the county.

The fjord starts as runoff from the Jostedalsbreen, Europe's largest mainland glacier, in the east and it flows west, emptying into the ocean just south of the Stadlandet peninsula. The mouth of the fjord lies between the large islands of Vågsøy and Bremangerlandet (with the smaller island of Husevågøy lying in the middle of the mouth).

There are several smaller fjords which branch off the main Nordfjorden:  Eidsfjorden, Ålfotfjorden, Hyefjorden, and Gloppefjorden.  The fjord reaches a maximum-depth of  near the mouth of the Eidsfjorden and also by the village of Bryggja.

Transportation
The fjord has no road or rail crossings, but it has three regular ferry crossings.  There is an electric ferry from Anda to Lote as part of the European route E39 highway, using 75 kWh per crossing.  Another crossing is from Isane to Stårheim.  The final crossing is near the mouth of the fjord from the town of Måløy to Oldeide.  This final crossing also includes a stop at the island of Husevågøy in the middle of the fjord.

Settlements
There are numerous old fishing communities located along the fjord that date back to pre-Viking times.  Some of the notable population centers along the fjord include the town of Måløy (near the north side of the mouth in Kinn), the villages of Bryggja and Totland (in Stad); Rugsund, Davik, and Ålfoten (in Bremanger); Kjølsdalen, Stårheim, Nordfjordeid, and Lote (in Stad); Sandane and Gimmestad (in Gloppen); and Randabygda, Utvik, Innvik, Roset, Stryn, Olden, and Loen (in Stryn).

Media gallery

See also
 List of Norwegian fjords

References

Fjords of Vestland
Kinn
Stad, Norway
Bremanger
Gloppen
Stryn